Kanthi Uttar Assembly constituency is an assembly constituency in Purba Medinipur district in the Indian state of West Bengal.

Overview
As per orders of the Delimitation Commission, No. 213 Kanthi Uttar Assembly constituency is composed of the following: Deshapran CD Block, Brajachauli, Debendra, Kanaidighi, Kumirda, Lauda and Marishda gram panchayats of Contai III and Bathuari gram panchayat of Egra II community development block.

Kanthi Uttar Assembly constituency is part of No. 31 Kanthi (Lok Sabha constituency).

Members of Legislative Assembly

Election results

2021

2011

  

.# Swing calculated on Congress+Trinamool Congress vote percentages taken together in 2006.

1977-2006
In the 2006 state assembly elections, Chakradhar Maikap of CPI(M) won the Contai North assembly seat defeating his nearest rival Jyotirmoy Kar of Trinamool Congress. Contests in most years were multi cornered but only winners and runners are being mentioned. Jyotirmoy Kar of Trinamool Congress defeated Chakradhar Maikap of CPI(M) in 2001. Chakradhar Maikap of CPI(M) defeated Mukul Bikash Maiti of Congress in 1996. Mukul Bikash Maity of Congress defeated Anil Kumar Manna of Janata Dal in 1991. Ram Sankar Kar of CPI(M) defeated Dwijendra Maiti of Congress in 1987. Mukul Bikash Maity of Congress defeated Anurup Panda of CPI(M) in 1982. Rashbehari Pal of Janata Party defeated Sailaja Das of Congress in 1977.

1951-1972
Kamakshyanandan Das Mohapatra of CPI won in 1972. Anil Kumar Manna of PSP won in 1971. Subodh Gopal Guchhati of PSP won in 1969. L.Das of Congress won in 1967. Bejoy Krishna Maity of Congress won in 1962. Natendra Nath Das of PSP won in 1957. In independent India's first election in 1951 Sudhir Chandra Das of KMPP won the Contai North seat.

References

Assembly constituencies of West Bengal
Politics of Purba Medinipur district